Jim Tracy (born October 9, 1956) is an American politician and the Tennessee Director for Rural Development for the Trump Administration. He is a former member of the Tennessee Senate for the 14th district, which is composed of Bedford County, Moore County, and part of Rutherford County.

Tennessee Senate
Among legislation Tracy sponsored was a bill that would ban smoking in indoor public places, places owned or operated by the state, and enclosed areas of employment. The bill passed the State and Local Government Committee with five senators in favor and two against. It passed in May 2007 and took effect on October 1, 2007.

Tracy was the Assistant Floor Leader of the Senate Republican Caucus, the Chair of the Senate Transportation Committee, and a member of the Senate Education Committee and the Senate State and Local Government Committee.

Before his election to the Senate, Tracy graduated from the University of Tennessee at Martin with a Bachelor of Science degree and worked as an insurance agent.

Congressional campaigns

2010 U.S. Congressional campaign

In December 2009, after incumbent U.S. Representative Bart Gordon decided to retire, Tracy announced that he would run in the Republican primaries for the state's 6th Congressional district. It was one of the few districts in which John McCain’s margin of victory (25 percentage points) in the 2008 presidential election was larger than George W. Bush's in 2004 (20 points). Among the possible candidates mentioned by insiders were state Representatives Henry Fincher and Mike McDonald, both Democrats who declined to run. Tracy's biggest competition in the Republican primary came from state Senator Diane Black and former Rutherford County GOP chairwoman Lou Ann Zelenik. Newt Gingrich endorsed Tracy. He finished third in the primary.

2014 U.S. Congressional campaign

Tracy announced that he would challenge Representative Scott DesJarlais of Tennessee's 4th congressional district in the 2014 Republican primary. By the end of June 2013 he had raised nearly $750,000. DesJarlais won the Republican primary by a mere 38 votes before going on to win the general election handily.

USDA Rural Development
In 2017 Tracy was appointed Tennessee state director of USDA Rural Development.

References

External links
Jim Tracy's profile at the Tennessee General Assembly Website
State Senate Campaign Website
Defunct Congressional Campaign Website
An article from the Associated Press, mirrored by The Daily Times
The bill at the Website of the Tennessee General Assembly
 
 Campaign contributions at OpenSecrets.org

Living people
Republican Party Tennessee state senators
1956 births
21st-century American politicians